A collet is a holding device, a subtype of chuck.

Collet may also refer to:

 Collet (name)
 Collet baronets, St Clere in the parish of Ightham in the County of Kent, was a title in the Baronetage of the United Kingdom
 Collet v. Collet, a Supreme Court of the United States decision
 The root–hypocotyl transition zone of a plant
 The Dream Collet, a magical book in the Yes! PreCure 5 anime

See also

 Abismo Guy Collet, the deepest cave in South America
 Le Collet-de-Dèze, a commune in the Lozère department in southern France
 Collet (Belize House constituency), a Belize City-based constituency of the Belize House of Representatives
 Collets Bookshop, Charing Cross Road, London, founded by Eva Collet Reckitt (1890–1976)
 Colet, a surname
 Collett (disambiguation)
 Colette (1873–1954), French novelist nominated for the Nobel Prize in Literature in 1948
 Collette (disambiguation)

People 
 Constant Collet (1889–1937), French racing cyclist. He finished in last place in the 1910 Tour de France
 Thierry Collet, Mauritian football player who currently plays for Pointe-aux-Sables Mates in the Mauritian Premier League and for the Mauritius national football team as a midfielder
 Vincent Collet (born 1963), French former professional basketball player and a current professional basketball coach.
 Wilfred Collet (1856–1929), British colonial administrator who was governor of British Honduras and then of British Guiana
 Mery Godigna Collet (born 1959), Venezuelan artist, writer, philanthropist and environmental advocate living in Austin, Texas
 Guy Christian Collet (1929–2004), French scientist, explorer and spelunker who came to live in Brazil after the World War II
 Collet Bou Gergis
 Collet Brunel
 Mark Collet (disambiguation)